The National Zoological Park (originally Delhi Zoo) is a  zoo in New Delhi, India. A 16th-century citadel, a sprawling green island and a motley collection of animals and birds, all in the middle of a burgeoning urban Delhi.
The zoo can be seen on foot or using a battery-operated vehicle which can be rented at the zoo. Visitors are not permitted to bring any food other than drinking water, but there is a canteen in the zoo. The zoo is closed on every Friday and national holidays.

History

The Delhi zoo came decades later after New Delhi was built. although the idea to have a zoo at the national capital was mooted in 1951, the park was inaugurated in November 1959.

In 1952 the Indian Board for Wildlife created a committee to look into creating a zoo for Delhi. The government of India was to develop the zoo and then turn it over to Delhi as a working enterprise. In 1953 the committee approved the location of the zoo, and in October 1955 it assigned N. D. Bachkheti of the Indian Forest Service to oversee the creation of the zoo.

Initially Major Aubrey Weinman of the Ceylon Zoological Garden (now the National Zoological Gardens of Sri Lanka) was asked to help draw the plans for the zoo, but because he was not available for the long term, Carl Hagenbeck of the Zoological Garden of Hamburg was hired. In March 1956, Hagenbeck presented a preliminary plan, which included the recommendation to use moated enclosures for the new zoo. The plan was modified as needed to account for local conditions, and approved by the Indian government in December 1956.

By the end of 1959, the Northern part of the zoo was complete, and animals which had been arriving for some time and which had been housed in temporary pens were moved into their permanent homes. The park was opened on 1 November 1959 as the Delhi Zoo. In 1982 it was officially renamed to National Zoological Park, with hopes that it could become a model for other zoos in the country.

Maqsood incident
On 23 September 2014, a man named Maqsood, fell in white tiger's moat accidentally. The children around started throwing stones at the tiger. The man was then carried away and mauled by the enraged tiger after some minutes. The man later succumbed to his injuries.
The incident, which took place between 12.30 pm and 1 pm, created a sensation and word soon spread through the metropolis, with pictures and video of the tiger - one of the zoo's star attractions - dragging the man going viral.

Exhibits

The zoo is home to about 1350 animals representing almost 130 species of animals and birds from around the world.

Mammals

Birds

Reptiles

Conservation breeding
The zoo is part of conservation breeding programmes of the Central Zoo Authority for the royal Bengal tiger, Indian rhinoceros, swamp deer, Asiatic lion, brow antlered deer, and red junglefowl.

The breeding program for the brow-antlered deer has been successful, starting with a pair of these deer in 1962, that individuals from the herd have been distributed to zoos in Ahmedabad, Kanpur, Lucknow, Hyderabad, Junagarh, and Mysore, and have acclimated well to all of these locations.

Gallery

See also

 Najafgarh drain bird sanctuary, Delhi
 Asola Bhatti Wildlife Sanctuary, Delhi
 Sultanpur National Park, bordering Delhi in adjoining Gurgaon District, Haryana
 Okhla Sanctuary, bordering Delhi in adjoining Uttar Pradesh

References

External links

 
 Official website of: "Central Zoo Authority of India" (CZA), Government of India

Parks in Delhi
Zoos in India
Tourist attractions in Delhi
1959 establishments in Delhi
Zoos established in 1959